{{DISPLAYTITLE:C20H26N2O4}}
The molecular formula C20H26N2O4 (molar mass: 358.43 g/mol) may refer to:

 Binospirone, a partial agonist at 5HT1A somatodendritic autoreceptors
 Itopride, a prokinetic benzamide derivative
 Ronactolol, a beta blocker

Molecular formulas